Leuconitocris gigantea is a species of beetle in the family Cerambycidae. It was described by Nonfried in 1892.

References

Leuconitocris
Beetles described in 1892